Batchelor Heights is a neighbourhood of the city of Kamloops, British Columbia, Canada. Its name derives from that of Batchelor Hill, a local landmark named for Owen Salisbury Batchelor, an early settler, prospector and rancher who lived in the area.

See also
Batchelor Range
Brocklehurst, Kamloops

References

Neighbourhoods in Kamloops